Mees Hilgers (born 13 May 2001) is a Dutch professional footballer who plays as a defender for Eredivisie club Twente.

Career
On 6 December 2018, Hilgers signed his first professional contract with FC Twente. He made his professional debut with Twente in a 2–1 Eredivisie win over AFC Ajax on 5 December 2020.

Personal life
Born in the Netherlands, Hilgers has Indonesian descent from his mother who is Manadonese (Minahasan).

Career statistics

Club

References

External links
 

2001 births
Living people
Sportspeople from Amersfoort
Dutch footballers
Dutch people of Indonesian descent
Minahasa people
Indo people
Association football defenders
FC Twente players
Eredivisie players
Footballers from Utrecht (province)